In mathematics, the Rayleigh quotient for a given complex Hermitian matrix M and nonzero vector x is defined as:

For real matrices and vectors, the condition of being Hermitian reduces to that of being symmetric, and the conjugate transpose  to the usual transpose . Note that  for any non-zero scalar c. Recall that a Hermitian (or real symmetric) matrix is diagonalizable with only real eigenvalues.

The Rayleigh quotient is used in the min-max theorem to get exact values of all eigenvalues. It is also used in eigenvalue algorithms (such as Rayleigh quotient iteration) to obtain an eigenvalue approximation from an eigenvector approximation.

The range of the Rayleigh quotient (for any matrix, not necessarily Hermitian) is called a numerical range and contains its spectrum. When the matrix is Hermitian, the numerical radius is equal to the spectral norm. Still in functional analysis,  is known as the spectral radius. In the context of C*-algebras or algebraic quantum mechanics, the function that to M associates the Rayleigh–Ritz quotient  R(M,x) for a fixed x and M varying through the algebra would be referred to as "vector state" of the algebra.

In quantum mechanics, the Rayleigh quotient gives the expectation value of the observable corresponding to the operator M for a system whose state is given by x.

If we fix the complex matrix M, then the resulting Rayleigh quotient map (considered as a function of x) completely determines M via the polarization identity; indeed, this remains true even if we allow M to be non-Hermitian. (However, if we restrict the field of scalars to the real numbers, then the Rayleigh quotient only determines the symmetric part of M.)

Bounds for Hermitian M
This is immediate after observing that the Rayleigh quotient is a weighted average of eigenvalues of M:

It is then easy to verify that the bounds are attained at the corresponding eigenvectors .

The fact that the quotient is a weighted average of the eigenvalues can be used to identify the second, the third, ... largest eigenvalues. Let  
be the eigenvalues in decreasing order.

Special case of covariance matrices
An empirical covariance matrix  can be represented as the product  of the data matrix  pre-multiplied by its transpose . Being a positive semi-definite matrix,  has non-negative eigenvalues, and orthogonal (or orthogonalisable) eigenvectors, which can be demonstrated as follows.

Firstly, that the eigenvalues  are non-negative:

Secondly, that the eigenvectors  are orthogonal to one another:
 
if the eigenvalues are different – in the case of multiplicity, the basis can be orthogonalized.

To now establish that the Rayleigh quotient is maximized by the eigenvector with the largest eigenvalue, consider decomposing an arbitrary vector  on the basis of the eigenvectors :

where

is the coordinate of  orthogonally projected onto . Therefore, we have:

which, by orthonormality of the eigenvectors, becomes:

The last representation establishes that the Rayleigh quotient is the sum of the squared cosines of the angles formed by the vector  and each eigenvector , weighted by corresponding eigenvalues.

If a vector  maximizes , then any non-zero scalar multiple  also maximizes , so the problem can be reduced to the Lagrange problem of maximizing  under the constraint that .

Define: . This then becomes a linear program, which always attains its maximum at one of the corners of the domain.

Thus, the Rayleigh quotient is maximized by the eigenvector with the largest eigenvalue.

Formulation using Lagrange multipliers 
Alternatively, this result can be arrived at by the method of Lagrange multipliers. The first part is to show that the quotient is constant under scaling , where  is a scalar

Because of this invariance, it is sufficient to study the special case . The problem is then to find the critical points of the function

subject to the constraint  In other words, it is to find the critical points of 

where  is a Lagrange multiplier. The stationary points of  occur at

and 

This property is the basis for principal components analysis and canonical correlation.

Use in Sturm–Liouville theory
Sturm–Liouville theory concerns the action of the linear operator

on the inner product space defined by

of functions satisfying some specified boundary conditions at a and b. In this case the Rayleigh quotient is

This is sometimes presented in an equivalent form, obtained by separating the integral in the numerator and using integration by parts:

Generalizations
 For a given pair (A, B) of matrices, and a given non-zero vector x, the generalized Rayleigh quotient is defined as:  The Generalized Rayleigh Quotient can be reduced to the Rayleigh Quotient  through the transformation  where  is the Cholesky decomposition of the Hermitian positive-definite matrix B.
 For a given pair (x, y) of non-zero vectors, and a given Hermitian matrix H, the generalized Rayleigh quotient can be defined as:  which coincides with R(H,x) when x = y. In quantum mechanics, this quantity is called a "matrix element" or sometimes a "transition amplitude".

See also
 Field of values
 Min-max theorem
 Rayleigh's quotient in vibrations analysis
 Dirichlet eigenvalue

References

Further reading
 Shi Yu, Léon-Charles Tranchevent, Bart Moor, Yves Moreau, Kernel-based Data Fusion for Machine Learning: Methods and Applications in Bioinformatics and Text Mining, Ch. 2, Springer, 2011.

Linear algebra